Anand Modak (13 May 1951 – 23 May 2014) was an acclaimed Marathi film composer and music director in Marathi cinema and Marathi theatre, known for his experimental style. He is notable films include Lapandav (1993), Chaukat Raja (1991), Tu Tithe Mee (1998), Naatigoti (2006), Harishchandrachi Factory (2009), Samaantar (2009), and Dambis (2011). In theatre, his notable compositions were for Mahanirvan, Mahapoor, Kheliya, Raigadala Jeva Jag Yete, Begum Barve, Chaukatcha Raja, and Mukta.

Early life and background
He was born in Akola, where he completed his primary education from Akola Education Society, Akola and also took early lessons in music. His mother was a singer, and later for taking further lessons in Music he came to Pune. He graduated from S.P. College (University of Pune) in Pune.

Career
Anand Modak was a versatile, popular and legendary music director in India. He composed music for several movies including Marathi, Hindi & English Films.

In Pune, 
Modak came in touch with theatre directors like Jabbar Patel and Satish Alekar, who were directing experimental theatre. He started his music career in 1972, assisting Bhaskar Chandavarkar, the composer for Vijay Tendulkar's noted play Ghashiram Kotwal directed by Jabbar Patel in Pune. Later he started composing independently in 1974, with Satish Alekar's acclaimed Marathi play Mahanirvan for Theatre Academy, Pune, a theatre organisation in 1973 he was also founder member of the academy.

Meanwhile, he worked with Bank of Maharashtra while still making music, he completed his 35 years service & retired from job in 2010. His work in theatre, lead to composing music for radio, television, plays and eventually Marathi cinema, and later in career devotional music. He was known for his experimental style, and with music without using much instruments. He even did cinematography for the film Naatigoti (2009).

Most notable mentions about music he has given for award-winning movies Chaukat Raja, Tu Tithe Mee and Harishchandrachi Factory, and plays like  Mahapoor, Kheliya, Raigadala Jeva Jag Yete, Begum Barve, Chaukatcha Raja, and Mukta. One of his last films was biopic Yashwantrao Chavan – Bakhar Eka Vadalachi (2014). Over the years, he received both popular and critical acclaim for his work. He won Maharashtra State Film Award for Best Music, for Doghi, Mukta, Raosaheb, and Dhoosar. Till date he is the only music director in Marathi film industry who won Maharashtra State Film Award for Best Music continuously for 3 years for the films Doghi, Mukta (film), and Raosaheb

His finest musical work came perhaps in Marathi non-film sphere. In 1980s and 1990s he was part of a prolific group in Pune whose other prominent members were Rajeev Paranjape, Chandrakant Kale, Madhuri Purandare. They did much acclaimed shows like Preet-rang and Amrit-gAthA; for Amrut-gatha, Anand Modak had set to tune verses of saint-poets Jnandev, Namdev, Eknath, Tukaram.

He died in Pune following a heart attack, at the age of 63. He was survived by his wife Ragini, Daughters Antara & Aalapini, Granddaughter Prarthana, Grandsons Abhang & Abeer and son-in-laws.

Selected filmography

Films

References

External links
 

1951 births
2014 deaths
People from Akola
Marathi film score composers
Musicians from Pune
Savitribai Phule Pune University alumni
Indian musical theatre composers
Marathi theatre
20th-century Indian musicians